Ludmila Seefried-Matejková (born 13 November 1938 in Heřmanův Městec, Czechoslovakia) is a Czech sculptor and painter living in Berlin.

Biography
Ludmila Seefried-Matějková spent her childhood and the war years in Heřmanův Městec. Her father, František Matějka, owned a sawmill, her mother, Ludmila, looked after the family, household and garden. Music, painting and literature also played an important role in their lives.

After February 1948 the family was dispossessed and her father displaced by force 250 km away from the family.  Her mother and the two daughters were at the mercy of the new communist rulers. The trauma experienced during this period sharpened her awareness of injustice. In 1951, the whole family was forcibly displaced to Mariánské Lázně.

Matějková studied at sculpture class of Arts Grammar School in Prague with Prof. M. Uchytilová-Kucová (1953–1956) and made several attempts to enter university. In spite of passing examinations, she was rejected for political reasons. In between exams she undertook practical stonemason training and worked in a porcelain factory in Duchcov. After a last unsuccessful attempt in Bratislava she returned to Mariánské Lázně and worked for three years as an art teacher in Mariánské Lázně and Cheb and as a graphic artist at the Mariánské Lázně Arts Centre KaSS. At a local theatre Kruh/Circle in the arts centre she acts, sings, writes, portrays friends.

Her daughter Marketa was born in 1965, but marriage broke down and was divorced. In 1964 she submitted application for membership in the Czech Artists Association (CSVU) and during the Prague spring she grabbed opportunity to study abroad. In 1967 she was admitted to the Berlin University of the Arts (HfBK) in West Berlin, in the sculptor class of Prof. Joe Henry Lonas.

She completed studies in master class in 1973. Since then, she had been working as a freelance sculptress in Berlin. Here she met her husband Rainer-Maria Seefried, received German nationality and decided to live in Germany.

In the 1990s Ludmila Seefried-Matejková was a founding member of the Künstlersonderbundes-Realism in Germany in  Berlin (1990) and of the international arts association PRO ARTE VIVENDI in Berlin and Mariánské Lázně (1998). The projects are supported by the Czech Embassy in Berlin and the Deutsch Tschechischen Zukunfts-Fonds. In 1994  she became member of the Darmstädter Sezession in Darmstadt.

She had several individual exhibitions in Germany and elsewhere in Europe. Seefried-Matějková lives and works in Berlin and Malcesine.

Works

Ludmila Seefried-Matejkova studied figure sculpture under Prof.Marie Uchytilova-Kucova in Prague. She was able to look into the abstract form under Prof. Joe Henry Lonas. Her sculptures from this period were stylized anthropomorphic or bioform constructions in plaster.

She soon realized that abstraction limits her possibilities of expression and returned to the figure sculpting. The hyper-realistic, life-size polyester figure” Hanna” (final work for master class at the HfBK 1973) marked out future direction of her sculptural works. The effect of her figural sculptures was often intensified by environment installations: Scream 1976, On Edge 1977, Outside the Door 1980 and others.

Since 1980 she has returned to classic materials: clay, stone and wood. She takes her subjects from life around her, the city with its variety of human characters and their fates, the social differences to the fringes of society. A series of heads/busts of different characters, mainly in terracotta, were the Turkish Woman 1983, Homeless 1990, Cunning Stockbroker and Girl at the Exhibition 1996 and others. Her sculptures  based on reality were transformed portraits  of real people from everyday life, interpreted by the artist into her own sculptural language: Beggar Woman 1997, Underground 2001-2 and others. The sculpture Father`s Hat 1995 is a self-portrait.  

Struck by her childhood and early youth experiences, she often depicts pain, violence and aggression as important themes in her work. She employs expressive symbols: Scream  1976, Strangling 1985, Homo homini lupus 1992/93, and Seed of Hatred 1993.

The world of the human soul with its silent dramas such as self-torment, anxiety and loneliness (Solitude 2004) as well as internal experiences, self-awareness such as contemplation and meditation are equally reflected in her works: Catharsis 1979, Meditation 1980 and 2002.  Her summer works in stone and wood were created in her Italian studio. The subjects are party biblical or influenced by her reading: Job 2003, Resurrection 2008, Ophelia 1997, Kafka/Metamorphosis 2000, Somnambulist 2013 and others.

Drawings were always an important part of Ludmila Seefried-Matejkova's works – from sketches in pubs, underground trains or on the beach to portraits and studies of people, mainly in pencil, charcoal, pastel or pen-and-ink.

As a representative of realism, which has quite a tradition in Germany, Ludmila Seefried-Matejkova was  successful in several  Kunst am Bau competitions Justice 1984, Double-Admiral 1985, The Dance on the Volcano 1988 and several other sculptural objects in the cityscape of Berlin.

Realizations

 1964 Mouth Organ Player, Mariánské Lázně
 1984 Justice, Criminal Court Moabit, Berlin
 1985 Double Admiral, Admiralstraße, Berlin Kreuzberg
 1985 Ernst Heilmann, memorial Plaque for victims of Fascism, Berlin-Kreuzberg
 1987 Four Seasons, relief for primary school, Berlin Kreuzberg
 1988 Carl von Ossietzky, memorial, Berlin-Kreuzberg
 1988 Playing with Fire, fountain Berlin-Wedding
 1988 Police Machine, Police Berlin-Spandau
 1989 Fountain Head, Job Centre Kiel
 1991 Relief for Fire Station, Berlin Zehlendorf
 1993 Theodor Lessing, memorial plaque, Mariánské Lázně 
 1993 Prayer, Malcesine 
 2002  Archangel Michael ,relief for Chapel St. Michael, Malcesine

Collections
 Berlinische Gallery, Berlin
 Communal Gallery Berlin
 Nicolas Treadwell Gallery, London
 private collections home and abroad

Solo exhibitions
 1964-1968 Mariánské Lázně
 1981 Artist of the Month, Communal Gallery, Berlin
 1987 House at Lützowplatz, Berlin
 1989 Municipal Gallery, Castle Oberhausen, (with Sarah Haffner, Maina M. Musky)
 1992 Heritage and Future, City Hall Brno
 1992 Heritage and Future, Mánes, Prague
 1992 Heritage and Future Kolonady Mariánské Lázně
 1996 Palazzo dei Capitani, Malcesine
 1998 Gallery Rutzmoser, Munich
 1998 Between Two Worlds, Communal Gallery, Berlin
 2000 Gallery Aeras, Herrenhut, Culture Centre Čáslav, Small Theater Liberec
 2001 Theaterei in Castle Erbach
 2001 Anglican Chapel Mariánské Lázně
 2002 Gallery Rutzmoser, Munich, Třebíč Castle 
 2003 Palacky University, Olomouc
 2004 Slovakian Museum, Uherské Hradiště
 2005 Diocese Museum Plzeň
 2005 Sculptures and Drawings, Ludmila Seefried-Matejkova, Sculpture Forum, Isernhagen
 2007 Pictures of People- Sculptures and Drawings, Berlin-Tempelhof
 2011 Between Two Worlds, (with Zuzana Richter, Photography), Czech Centre, Prague
 2013 On the Fringe, Topicuv Salon Prague

Group exhibitions
 1973  exhibition of students of the HfBK, House at Kleinspark, Berlin
 1973  Annual exhibition of German Artists Association, Berlin
 1974  Annual exhibition of German Artist association, Mainz
 1976  Pictures of People, Schwetzingen and Cochen
 1977  International Female Artists 1877-1977
 1978  The Seventies meet the Twenties - Ugly Realism, London
 1980  New Darmstadt Secession, Darmstadt
 1981  Great Art Exhibition Munich, House of Arts, Munich
 1983  Sculptors Symposium St. Margareten Burgenland, Austria
 1984  Women's Art at Womenswold, Nicholas Treadwell Gallery, Denne Hill, Kent
 1986  Tod und Leben, Obere Galerie – Haus am Lützowplatz, Berlin, with Waldemar Grzimek, Carl Hofer, Käthe Kollwitz, Alfred Kubin, Heinrich Richter-Berlin, Georges Rouault, Ingo Kühl among others 1986.
 1988  Berlin Female Artists, Narni, Italy
 1988  Berlin Artists,City Hall Odense, Danmark
 1993  Realism Triennial, Martin-Gropius-Bau, Berlin
 1994  7 Berlin Realists, Wendhausen Castle
 1997  I am a Berliner, Mathew's Church, Berlin
 1999  Gallery at Potsdamer Platz, Autumn Salon, Paris
 2001-2004 Artists Sonderbund in Germany, Communal Gallery Berlin
 2002-2003 United Buddy Bears at Pariser Platz, Berlin
 2005-12 Position of artists from the Darmstadt Secession, Graz
 2006-2007 Dialogue of the Generations, Berlin Communal Gallery, Diamond Gallery, Prague
 2008 Realism from 1968-2008, Sculpture Forum Isernhagen
 2009 Czech Art Yesterday and Today, (Otto Gutfreund, Ludmila Seefried-Matejkova, Rudolf Valenta, Zuzana Richter), Berlin
 2010  20 Years Artists, Sonderbund in Germany, Berlin-Wedding
 2011-2014  North Art, Kunstwerk Carlshütte, Büdelsdorf

Bibliography
 Realismus. 45 Jahre Deutsche Bildhauerei, 2014, Karina Türr, Michael Imhof Verlag, Petersberg 
 Ludmila Seefried-Matějková, Na pokraji/On the Edge, 2013, cat., Topičův salon, Praha
 Ludmila Seefried-Matejková, Zwischen zwei Welten, 1998, Udo Christoffel, Rainer Höynck, cat., Kommunale Galerie, Berlin
 Ludmila Seefried-Matejková, 1992, Stefanie Endlich, Anděla Horová, cat. 54 pp., Dům umění města Brna, 
 Ludmila Seefried-Matejková, Rauscher, 1985, Stefanie Endlich, 72 pp.
 Sex Female, the art of contemporary occupation artist, 1984, Denne Hill, Nicholas Treadwell publications, Womensworld Kent
 Ludmila Seefried-Matějková, 1981, edition: Künstler der Monats, Kommunale Galerie, Berlin, 16 pp.

References

External links

Official website (de)
Kunstlersonderbund (de)
Darmstaedtersezession (de)
Realization, Berlín-Wilmersdorf
Interview ČRO Vltava 2013 (cs)
 Interview, 2013, ČRO Praha (de)
Interview, Plzeň, 2005, ČRO Praha (de)
Pro Arte Vivendi - Internationaler Kunstverein e.V., Berlin - Marienbad

Czech sculptors
Czech women sculptors
20th-century German sculptors
21st-century German sculptors
1938 births
Living people
People from Heřmanův Městec
20th-century Czech women artists
21st-century Czech women artists